The 2017–18 NZ Touring Cars Championship (known for commercial reasons as the 2017–18 BNT V8s Championship) is the nineteenth season of the series, and the third under the NZ Touring Cars name. The field comprises three classes racing on the same grid. Class one features both V8ST and NZV8 TLX cars. Class two and three consists of older NZV8 TL and varying touring cars.

Entrants

Calendar

Round 1 will be held in support of the 2017 ITM Auckland SuperSprint while Round 5 will be in support of the 2018 New Zealand Grand Prix.

Championship standings

References

External links

Touring Cars
Touring Cars
NZ Touring Cars Championship seasons